Sten Ola Källenius (born 11 June 1969) is a Swedish business executive. He is the chairman of the board of management of Mercedes-Benz Group, and CEO of Mercedes-Benz. He is the first non-German in both positions.

Education 
Källenius graduated from the Stockholm School of Economics and the University of St. Gallen, with a master's degrees, the CEMS Master in International Management (CEMS MIM) and Finance and Accounting.

Career 
Källenius began his career in 1993 at the former Daimler-Benz AG, where he worked in the "International Junior Research Group". After other early assignments in management control, he assumed various management positions within Daimler AG, including head of the "Powertrain" purchasing department of the Mercedes-Benz Cars group.

In 2010, he took over the chairmanship of the management of Mercedes-AMG GmbH, which he relinquished to Tobias Moers on 1 October 2013. Since October 2013, he has been a member of the executive board of Mercedes-Benz Cars and was responsible for sales. He was appointed to the board of management of Daimler AG on 1 January 2015. On 1 January 2017, he took over the management of the  "Group Research and Mercedes-Benz Cars Development" division as a member of the executive board. He became the successor to Thomas Weber, who had been responsible for this division since 2004. Britta Seeger succeeded Källenius as board member for Mercedes-Benz Cars Sales.

Källenius succeeded Dieter Zetsche as the Chairman of the Board of Management of Daimler AG on 22 May 2019.

Positions 
Källenius is a strong advocate of plug-in hybrids and electric vehicles within Daimler. He has pushed the new electric model initiative, product and technology brand EQ, along with a $12 billion investment into Mercedes-Benz's new line of battery-powered vehicles. Within the initiative he has proposed and advocated for a series of ten new and purely electric Mercedes-Benz models to be launched by 2022. The first car was the Mercedes-Benz EQC SUV, launched in the first half of 2019.

Personal life 
Källenius is married; the couple have three sons. His wife is another green influencer (part of the Green Globe Organisation) and is pushing the plug-in hybrid and wants him to make the entire Mercedes-Benz range, including the flagship G-Wagon, fully electric.

References 

Living people
Swedish businesspeople
1969 births
Mercedes-Benz Group executives
Stockholm School of Economics alumni
University of St. Gallen alumni
People from Västervik Municipality
Mercedes-Benz in Formula One